Simone de Macedo e Oliveira, GCIH • GMC (born 11 February 1938) better known as Simone de Oliveira is a Portuguese singer and actress. She performed the Portuguese entries at the 1965 and 1969 editions of the Eurovision song contest.

Early life and career
Simone de Oliveira was born and raised in Lisbon. Her Portuguese mother had black African roots in São Tomé and Príncipe (then a Portuguese territory), and her father was Belgian. She started singing in high school.

Music career

She started her career at the end of the 1950s.

With "Sol de inverno" she represented Portugal at the Eurovision Song Contest 1965.

She became fairly famous in 1969 with the song "Desfolhada portuguesa", with lyrics by José Carlos Ary dos Santos and music by Nuno Nazareth Fernandes. This song was a great success in Portugal, having innovative lyrics during the time of the dictatorship of António de Oliveira Salazar. It represented Portugal at the Eurovision Song Contest 1969 in Madrid. Despite her popularity at home, it was not successful at the Eurovision, getting only 4 votes.

Eleven years later she was again selected by RTP to represent her country in the ninth edition of the OTI Festival (The Latin American counterpart of the Eurovision Song Contest). She performed the song "A tua espera" which got the 14th place with 9 points.

Other successful songs:

 "Maria solidão"
 "Deixa lá"
 "À tua espera"

In 2022, she was announced to be a coach on the generations version of The Voice Portugal alongside Mickael Carreira, Anselmo Ralph, and Bárbara Bandeira. At 84, she became the oldest The Voice coach globally.

Selected filmography

Theater
 A tragédia da Rua das Flores
 Passa por mim no Rossio (a great success in Portugal)
 Maldita cocaína.
 A homage to the singer Madalena Iglésias in the musical play What happened to Madalena Iglésias (another success)
 Alma Mahler-Werfel in Joshua Sobols play Alma (2003, directed by Paulus Manker) in Convento dos Inglesinhos in Lisbon.

Acting career

Television
She has participated in several Portuguese telenovelas: 

In 1993, Simone was also a jury member in the first season of SIC contest  (the Portuguese version of Stars in Their Eyes), which has uncovered new talents in Portuguese music.

Personal life
Simone is a breast cancer survivor and had the sickness twice.

References

External links
 Lyric of entry Sol de inverno, (1965) 
 Lyrics of entry  Desfolhada portuguesa, (1969)
 Blog with informations and photos of Simone Oliveira

1938 births
Living people
20th-century Portuguese women singers
Portuguese film actresses
Portuguese television actresses
Eurovision Song Contest entrants of 1965
Eurovision Song Contest entrants of 1969
Singers from Lisbon
Portuguese people of São Tomé and Príncipe descent
Portuguese people of Belgian descent
Eurovision Song Contest entrants for Portugal
20th-century Portuguese actresses
People from Lisbon
21st-century Portuguese actresses
Portuguese stage actresses
Telenovela actresses
Golden Globes (Portugal) winners